Freshwater swamp forests, or flooded forests, are forests which are inundated with freshwater, either permanently or seasonally. They normally occur along the lower reaches of rivers and around freshwater lakes. Freshwater swamp forests are found in a range of climate zones, from boreal through temperate and subtropical to tropical.

In the Amazon Basin of Brazil, a seasonally flooded forest is known as a várzea, and refers to a whitewater-inundated forest. Igapó refers to blackwater-inundated forest.

Peat swamp forests are swamp forests where waterlogged soils prevent woody debris from fully decomposing, which over time creates a thick layer of acidic peat.

Freshwater swamp forest ecoregions

Afrotropic 
 Eastern Congolian swamp forests (Democratic Republic of the Congo)
 Niger Delta swamp forests (Nigeria)
 Western Congolian swamp forests (Republic of the Congo, Democratic Republic of the Congo).

Australasia 
 Northern New Guinea lowland rain and freshwater swamp forests (Indonesia, Papua New Guinea)
 Southern New Guinea freshwater swamp forests (Indonesia, Papua New Guinea)

South and SE Asia 

 Borneo peat swamp forests (Brunei, Indonesia, Malaysia)
 Chao Phraya freshwater swamp forests (Thailand)
 Irrawaddy freshwater swamp forests (Myanmar)
 Peninsular Malaysian peat swamp forests (Malaysia, Thailand)
 Ratargul Swamp Forest (Bangladesh)
 Sundarbans freshwater swamp forests in Bangladesh and India
 Red River freshwater swamp forests (Vietnam)
 Southwest Borneo freshwater swamp forests (Indonesia)
 Tonle Sap-Mekong peat swamp forests (Cambodia, Vietnam)
 Wathurana freshwater swamp forest (Sri Lanka)
 Myristica swamp (India)
 Nelapattu Bird Sanctuary (India)

Neotropic 
 Cantão igapó forest (Brazil)
 Gurupa várzea (Brazil)
 Iquitos várzea (Bolivia, Brazil, Peru)
 Marajó várzea (Brazil)
 Monte Alegre várzea (Brazil)
 Orinoco Delta swamp forests (Guyana, Venezuela)
 Pantanos de Centla (Mexico)
 Paramaribo swamp forests (Guyana, Suriname)
 Purus várzea (Brazil)

See also 

 Coniferous swamp forest
 Mangrove swamp (saltwater swamp)

References 

Swamps
Tropical and subtropical moist broadleaf forests